Mount Kenyon is a mountain,  high, standing  northwest of Shenk Peak and  southwest of Barry Hill in the northern part of the Cumulus Hills, Antarctica. It was named by F. Alton Wade, leader of the Texas Tech Shackleton Glacier Expedition of the United States Antarctic Research Program (1962–1963), after Kenyon College, Gambier, Ohio, his alma mater.

References

Mountains of the Ross Dependency
Dufek Coast